Løten is the administrative centre of Løten Municipality in Innlandet county, Norway.

The Rørosbanen railway line runs through the village, stopping at the Løten Station. The Norwegian National Road 3 passes by the north side of the village.

Media gallery

References

Løten
Villages in Innlandet